Lin Wenyi (born September 1944) is a Chinese engineer and politician.

Career and education
Lin was the Chairman of the Taiwan Democratic Self-Government League between 2005 and 2017, a legally sanctioned minor political party in China, a Vice Chairman of the Chinese People's Political Consultative Conference. Lin's father was from Tainan, Taiwan; she was born in Qingdao.

A graduate of Tsinghua University, Lin worked in Xinjiang as a technician in her early years. After her stint in Xinjiang ended in 1973, she began working for the Chinese Academy of Sciences as a physicist. She has a doctorate from the University of Liverpool. Beginning in 1994 she was a full-time professor at Tsinghua University.

Lin has served in a variety of political posts during her life. She joined the Taiwan Democratic Self-Government League in December 1990. She was deputy director of education of Beijing Municipality, the assistant to the mayor, and between 1996 and 2003, the vice mayor of Beijing. In March 2003 she was named deputy secretary-general of the National People's Congress Standing Committee.

In December 2005 Lin was named Chairman of the Taiwan Democratic Self-Government League. She was involved in the preparation of the Beijing Olympics.

References 

Living people
1944 births
Politicians from Qingdao
Chinese women in politics
Chinese women engineers
Tsinghua University alumni
Alumni of the University of Liverpool
Chinese people of Taiwanese descent
Academic staff of Tsinghua University
Engineers from Shandong
People's Republic of China politicians from Shandong
Vice Chairpersons of the National Committee of the Chinese People's Political Consultative Conference
Members of the Taiwan Democratic Self-Government League
Delegates to the 10th National People's Congress
20th-century Chinese engineers
Leaders of political parties in China
20th-century women engineers
21st-century women engineers